Kathy J. Warden is an American business executive who serves as chief executive officer and president of Northrop Grumman, as of 2019.

Education
Warden graduated from Smithsburg High School. She then earned a bachelor's degree at James Madison University in 1992, and a master's degree in business administration at George Washington University in 1999.

Career
Warden is a cybersecurity and information technology expert. Early in her career, she worked for General Electric for nearly a decade, and held executive roles at Veridian Corporation and General Dynamics. Warden was also a principal in a venture capital firm, where she helped companies improve their business models and electronic publishing services.

Warden joined Northrop Grumman in 2008, initially serving as vice president and general manager of the company's cybersecurity business. In 2015, while serving as president of Northrop Grumman Information Systems, she was included in Federal Computer Week "Federal 100" list; the magazine credited her for increasing Northrop Grumman's participation in the CyberPatriot program and creation of the Advanced Cyber Technology Center, and for overseeing $1.5 billion in contracts for the 2014 fiscal year. Warden began her tenure as president of the Mission Systems sector in January 2016, when the company merged its Information Systems and Electronics Systems sectors. She has served as president and COO of Northrop Grumman since September 2017, and her tenure as CEO started on January 1, 2019.

Warden has been credited with leading the integration of Orbital ATK, later Northrop Grumman Innovation Systems. She was elected to Northrop Grumman's board of directors since her appointment to the CEO role in mid-2018.

Board service and recognition
Warden served on the Clinton administration's Internet Advisory Council. She has a position on the board of the Wolf Trap National Park for the Performing Arts. She serves on the Federal Reserve Bank of Richmond board, as of mid-2018. She also works with the Aspen Institute's computer security strategy group.

She joined James Madison University's board of visitors in October 2018. Previously, Warden served on the board of the university's College of Business, starting in 2016. She received a Business Achievement Award from James Madison University's Beta Gamma Sigma chapter in 2018.

Warden was included in Washingtonian 2017 list of the "most powerful women" in Washington, D.C., as well as the magazine's 2018 list of "Washington's Top Tech Leaders". She has ranked number 22 and number 80 on Fortune and CEOWORLD magazine's lists of "most powerful women", respectively.

References

External links
 

1970s births
Northrop Grumman people
James Madison University alumni
George Washington University School of Business alumni
Information technology in the United States
General Electric people
Living people